The Evangelical Magazine was a monthly magazine published in London from 1793 to 1904, and aimed at Calvinist Christians. It was supported by evangelical members of the Church of England, and by nonconformists with similar beliefs. Its editorial line included a strong interest in missionary work.

Launch
John Eyre, an Anglican, played a significant role in founding the Evangelical Magazine, and as its editor, to 1802. Robert Culbertson was involved in the early times, and was an editor. William Kingsbury contributed from the start. John Townsend (1757–1826) was a supporter; Edward Williams was another founder and editor.

In 1802 the Christian Observer began publication. It catered for evangelical Anglicans, and from this point the Evangelical Magazine came into the hands of Congregationalists.

Editorial succession
1803–1826 George Burder
c.1827–1857 John Morison
1877–1882 Henry Robert Reynolds

The successor from 1905 was the Evangelical British Missionary.

Portrait artists
William Thomas Fry, engraver
Henry Room, painter

Notes

Defunct magazines published in the United Kingdom
1793 establishments in Great Britain
1904 disestablishments in the United Kingdom